Tooni is a village in Tartu Parish, Tartu County in Estonia.
Tooni is located on the Estonian island Piirissaar. As of 2011, the village has a population of 11.

References

Villages in Tartu County